Colobothea unilineata is a species of beetle in the family Cerambycidae. It was described by Bates in 1872. It is known from Nicaragua and Panama.

References

unilineata
Beetles described in 1872